Jumièges Abbey was a Benedictine monastery, situated in the commune of Jumièges in the Seine-Maritime département, in Normandy, France.

History
Around 654 the abbey was founded on a gift of forested land belonging to the royal fisc presented by Clovis II and his queen, Balthild, to the Frankish nobleman Filibertus, who had been the companion of Saints Ouen and Wandrille at the Merovingian court of Dagobert I. Philibert became the first abbot, and Balthild's generosity added "many gifts and pastures from the royal fisc" but he was later obliged to leave Jumièges through the jealousy of certain enemies, and spent a period of exile from Neustria at the court of Bishop Ansoald of Poitiers; afterwards he founded monasteries at Pavilly, Montivilliers and Noirmoutier, where he died in about 685. Among those inspired by his example was the Irish monk Sidonius, who founded the monastery at Saint-Saëns. Under the second abbot, Saint Achard, Jumièges prospered and soon numbered nearly a thousand monks. 

Starting in 788, Charlemagne kept Tassilo III, the recently dethroned Agilolfing Duke of Bavaria and one of his sons (and thus a possibly dangerous avenger and successor), Theodo, arrested in the abbey. 

In the ninth century it was pillaged and burnt to the ground by the Vikings, but was rebuilt on a grander scale by William Longespee, Duke of Normandy (d. 942). A new church was consecrated in 1067 in the presence of William the Conqueror. 

Enjoying the patronage of the dukes of Normandy, the abbey became a great centre of religion and learning, its schools producing, amongst many other scholars, the national historian, William of Jumièges. It reached the zenith of its fame about the eleventh century, and was regarded as a model for all the monasteries of the province. It was renowned especially for its charity to the poor, being popularly called "Jumièges l'Aumônier".

The church was enlarged in 1256, and again restored in 1573. The abbots of Jumièges took part in all the great affairs of the church and state. One of them, Robert Champart, became Archbishop of Canterbury in 1051, after being Bishop of London. Many others became bishops in France, and some were also raised to the dignity of cardinal.

The fortunes of the abbey suffered somewhat through the English invasion of the fifteenth century, but it recovered and maintained its prosperity and high position until the whole province was devastated by the Huguenots and the Wars of Religion. In 1649, during the abbacy of Francis III, Jumièges was taken over by the Maurist Congregation, under which rule some of its former grandeur was resuscitated.

The French Revolution, however, ended its existence as a monastery, leaving only impressive ruins. These comprise the church, with its beautiful twin towers and western façade, and portions of the cloisters and library, the contents of which were removed to Rouen when the abbey was dissolved. In the middle of the former cloister, there is still the 500-year-old yew tree. A gallery of the cloister was bought by Lord Stuart de Rothesay to rebuild it in Highcliffe Castle near Bournemouth, Dorset.

The Nobel Prize-winning French novelist Roger Martin du Gard devoted his dissertation to an archaeological study of the ruins.

See also
List of Merovingian monasteries
Merovingian architecture
Merovingian art

Notes

Religious buildings and structures completed in 1067
Christian monasteries established in the 11th century
Benedictine monasteries in France
Buildings and structures in Seine-Maritime
Merovingian architecture
Romanesque architecture in Normandy
Ruins in Normandy
Tourist attractions in Seine-Maritime
Ruined abbeys and monasteries